Sanitization is the cleaning and disinfection of an area or an item. Sanitizing involves the use of heat or chemicals to reduce the number of microorganisms to safe levels. It can also refer to:

 Data sanitization, preventing recovery of erased information
 Sanitization (classified information), in government/military contexts
 Censorship, preventing publication of information
 HTML sanitization, removing potentially unsafe constructs from web pages
 Sanitation harvest, or sanitation cutting, removing plants to counter insects or diseases

See also
 Sanitation, provision of drinking water and disposal of sewage
 Data cleansing, detecting and correcting corrupt or inaccurate data